USS Chauncey (DD-296) was a  (ship) built for the United States Navy during World War I.

Description
The Clemson class was a repeat of the preceding  although more fuel capacity was added. They had a crew of 6 officers and 108 enlisted men.

Performance differed radically between the ships of the class, often due to poor workmanship. The Clemson class was powered by two steam turbines, each driving one propeller shaft, using steam provided by four water-tube boilers.

The ships were armed with four 4-inch (102 mm) guns in single mounts and were fitted with two  1-pounder guns for anti-aircraft defense. In many ships a shortage of 1-pounders caused them to be replaced by 3-inch (76 mm) guns. Their primary weapon, though, was their torpedo battery of a dozen 21 inch (533 mm) torpedo tubes in four triple mounts. They also carried a pair of depth charge rails. A "Y-gun" depth charge thrower was added to many ships.

Construction and career
Chauncey named for Isaac Chauncey, was launched 29 September 1918 by Union Iron Works, San Francisco, California; sponsored by Miss D. M. Todd; commissioned 25 June 1919 and reported to the Pacific Fleet. From the time of her commissioning, Chauncey sailed from San Diego and Mare Island to Hawaii and along the Pacific coast taking part in fleet exercises, gunnery practice, and other training activities. From 15 July 1920 to 14 October 1921, she was in ready reserve at San Diego and Mare Island, then returned to active duty as flagship of Destroyer Division 31.

On the evening of 8 September 1923, Chauncey in company with a large group of destroyers was sailing through a heavy fog from San Francisco to San Diego, when a navigational error on board the first ship in her column turned that destroyer and the six that followed toward the rocky California coast rather than on a reach down Santa Barbara Channel. All seven destroyers, including Chauncey, went aground on the jagged rocks off Point Pedernales, in what was called the Honda Point Disaster.

Chauncey stranded upright, high on the rocks, near , which had capsized. With none of her men lost, Chauncey at once went to the aid of Young, passing a line by which 70 of Young's crew clambered hand-over-hand to Chauncey. Swimmers from Chauncey then rigged a network of lifelines to the coastal cliffs, and both her men and Young's reached safety by this means. The abandoned Chauncey was wrecked by the surf, and was decommissioned 26 October 1923. All the hulks were sold for salvage and removal as of 25 September 1925.

Notes

References

External links
http://www.navsource.org/archives/05/296.htm

 

Clemson-class destroyers
Ships built in San Francisco
1918 ships
Shipwrecks of the California coast
Maritime incidents in September 1923